Ouse Bridge railway station was a railway station in Norfolk, England.

History
The station was opened with the line to Ely, and was originally named Ouze Bridge. It was approximately halfway between Denver and Hilgay Fen, which opened at the same time.

The station was renamed Ouse Bridge in April 1854, and closed on 1 January 1864.

Route

Notes

References

External links
 Position of Ouse Bridge Station on navigable O.S. map

Disused railway stations in Norfolk
Former Great Eastern Railway stations
Railway stations in Great Britain opened in 1847
Railway stations in Great Britain closed in 1864
1847 establishments in England